Rubiácea is a municipality in the state of São Paulo in Brazil. The population in 2020 was 3,162 and the area is 237.67 km². The elevation is 420 m.

References

Municipalities in São Paulo (state)